Nyo is a Burmese name. Notable people with this name include:

 Aung Moe Nyo, Burmese politician
 Ba Saw Nyo (1435–1494), Burmese king
 Chit Oo Nyo (born 1947), Burmese writer
 Kale Kye-Taung Nyo, Burmese king
 Khin Nyo
 Min Nyo San
 Mingyi Nyo
 Moe Nyo (born 1973), Burmese painter
 Nyo Min Lu, Burmese writer
 Nyo Min Lwin (born 1979), Burmese film director, scriptwriter and actor
 Nyo Mya, Burmese writer
 Nyo Nyo Thin (born 1967), Burmese lawyer and politician
 Nyo Twan Awng (born 1981)
 Saw Nyo Win, Burmese politician

See also
 Nyô
 NYO